The 1923 San Jose State Spartans football team represented State Teachers College at San Jose during the 1923 college football season.

San Jose State competed in the California Coast Conference (CCC). The team was led by first-year head coach Hovey C. McDonald and they played home games at Spartan Field in San Jose, California. The team finished the season winless, with a record of zero wins and six (0–6, 0–4 CCC). The Spartans only scored three points the entire season, while they gave up 262. That's an average score of 1–44, and included a shutout loss to the Stanford Freshman team of 0–79.

Schedule

Notes

References

San Jose State
San Jose State Spartans football seasons
San Jose State Spartans football